Aven or AVEN may refer to:

 Aven, Papua New Guinea, a village in Morobe Province
Aven (river) in Brittany, France
 Aven, a fictional bird race in Magic: The Gathering
Pitch (vertical space), in rock or ice climbing
Pyotr Aven, Russian businessman and politician
Asexual Visibility and Education Network, an Internet-based community to promote awareness of asexual orientation

See also 
 Avon (disambiguation)
 Avens (disambiguation)
 Pont-Aven, a commune (municipality) in Brittany, France